The 1945 New Zealand census was held on 25 September. Total population figures for cities, boroughs and counties are included in the 1946 Year Book. It was published in ten volumes, giving information such as population movement, density, housing, jobs, distance from public transport, country of birth, race and religion. Total population, including forces still abroad,  was 1,747,679. It was quite unevenly distributed, as shown in this table, which in the printed document is illustrated with maps of both main islands -

Usually, a census is held in New Zealand every five years, but the 1941 census got postponed due to World War II. The previous census that did proceed had been held in 1936, i.e. nine years earlier.

The 1941 census was postponed through section 36 of the Finance Act, 1940, which authorised the census due in 1941 to be taken between 1942 and 1945 (inclusive). As Minister of Industries and Commerce, Dan Sullivan was in charge of the Census and Statistics Department and in 1943, he commented that there was little hope for the census to be taken while the war was still going. In early April 1945, it became known that the government had plans to hold the census later that year and this was confirmed by Walter Nash in his capacity as acting prime minister on 11 April 1945, who confirmed that it would happen during September. One objective with the 1945 date was to be able to redefine electorate boundaries just prior to the 1946 general election. Bringing the census forward affected the census data. With World War II continuing until September 1945, thousands of young men were still overseas and the economy still geared to wartime conditions. There was lobbying from conservative circles, for example the Auckland Chamber of Commerce, the Otago-Southland Manufacturers' Association, and the New Zealand Farmers' Federation, for the census to be held in 1946 as originally scheduled. In an editorial, The New Zealand Herald also argued for adherence to the normal schedule, for example to make it easier for statisticians to provide timeline data (the census had been held every five years since 1851).

Census returns were released as they became known, on a city, borough, town district, or county basis. The first preliminary results were those issued for Havelock Town District, which appeared in newspapers on 3 October 1945. The results from the census were an input to the 1946 electoral redistribution. As the government had, in a surprise move, abolished the country quota through the Electoral Amendment Act, 1945, the redistribution changed the boundaries of every electorate prior to the 1946 general election.

Notes

References

Censuses in New Zealand
Census
New Zealand
September 1945 events in New Zealand